Helius flavus is a species of fly in the family Limoniidae. It is found in the  Palearctic .

References

External links
Images representing Helius at BOLD

Limoniidae
Insects described in 1856
Diptera of Europe
Taxa named by Francis Walker (entomologist)